{{DISPLAYTITLE:C21H18NO4}}
The molecular formula C21H18NO4 (molar mass: 348.37 g/mol, exact mass: 348.1236 u) may refer to:

 Chelerythrine, an alkaloid
 Nitidine, an alkaloid

Molecular formulas